Tavis Rock Hasenfus is an American attorney and politician serving as a member of the Maine House of Representatives from the 81st district. He assumed office on December 2, 2020.

Early life and education 
Hasenfus was born in Augusta, Maine and raised in Winthrop. After graduating from Winthrop High School in 2006. He earned a Bachelor of Arts degree in philosophy from the University of Maine and a Juris Doctor from the University of Maine School of Law.

Career 
Hasenfus served as an intern in the Kennebec County, Maine District Attorney's Office. He has since worked as an attorney at Levey, Wagley, Putman & Eccher. He was elected to the Maine House of Representatives in November 2020 and assumed office the following month. He is also a member of the Winthrop Lakes Region Chamber of Commerce and Winthrop Recreation Committee.

References 

Year of birth missing (living people)
Living people
People from Augusta, Maine
People from Winthrop, Maine
People from Readfield, Maine
Maine lawyers
Democratic Party members of the Maine House of Representatives
University of Maine alumni
University of Maine School of Law alumni